Troy Van Leeuwen (born January 5, 1970) is an American musician and record producer. He is best known as a guitarist and multi-instrumentalist in the rock band Queens of the Stone Age, with whom he has recorded four studio albums. Joining the band in 2002, he is the second-longest-serving member of the band, after founding member Josh Homme. Leeuwen is also a member of the supergroup Gone Is Gone and has fronted his own projects, Enemy and Sweethead.

Originally a member of Failure, Leeuwen joined the alternative rock supergroup A Perfect Circle in 1999, contributing to their first two studio albums, Mer de Noms (1999) and Thirteenth Step (2003), before joining Queens of the Stone Age to tour in support of their third studio album, Songs for the Deaf (2002). Leeuwen has remained in the band ever since, recording four albums with the band to date: Lullabies to Paralyze (2005), Era Vulgaris (2007), ...Like Clockwork (2013) and Villains (2017).

Leeuwen has contributed to several other Queens of the Stone Age-related side-projects, including The Desert Sessions, Mondo Generator, Eagles of Death Metal and The Gutter Twins. In 2016, Leeuwen was a member of Iggy Pop's touring band, supporting his album, Post Pop Depression (2016), recorded with his Queens of the Stone Age bandmates Josh Homme and Dean Fertita.

In 2022, while on a hiatus from Queens of Stone Age activities, Leeuwen became the touring guitarist for the punk band The Damned, filling in for founding member Captain Sensible. In October 2022, he replaced Dave Navarro in the alternative rock band Jane's Addiction for the duration of their tour with the Smashing Pumpkins, with Navarro struggling to recover from long COVID.

Biography

Van Leeuwen has a Dutch surname (he has ancestors from the Netherlands and has described himself as a third-generation American). He became interested in music at an early age and his dad would play early rock and roll records such as Chuck Berry. His first big influence in learning how to play rock came through listening to Led Zeppelin records. Playing drums initially, Van Leeuwen sought to imitate Zeppelin drummer, John Bonham, but later switched to guitar and discovered that he had an aptitude for it. He cites Jimmy Page as a big influence:

Music career 
In the late 1980s, Van Leeuwen played in Jester, a successful southern California band fronted by vocalist Eric Book. Jester released an EP, which is the earliest and most rare recording of a 16-year-old Van Leeuwen. He then played in a small band called Little Boots, with which he recorded a number of demos and played a few shows before the band's breakup. His next band was 60 Cycle, which released their debut "Pretender" in 1995, and their self-titled album the following year. It was during his time in 60 Cycle that Van Leeuwen met Kellii Scott, and the two started working on a project (later to be known as Enemy). Van Leeuwen went on to play in Failure. The band released three records and didn't enjoy any commercial success, but was praised by critics as a talented and almost revolutionary group. It was during a tour with Failure when Van Leeuwen met former Kyuss guitarist Josh Homme, who was presently playing rhythm guitar with The Screaming Trees. After the breakup of Failure, Van Leeuwen became a session musician and recording engineer, working with groups such as Orgy, Crazy Town, Coal Chamber and KoRn.

A Perfect Circle
It was during his time as a session musician that Van Leeuwen met Tool frontman Maynard James Keenan, who offered him a spot in his and Billy Howerdel's new band, A Perfect Circle. The band played their first show at LA's Viper Club Reception on August 15, 1999. After playing shows in Los Angeles, the band entered the studio to begin work on their debut album, Mer de Noms. The album was released on May 23, 2000, making it the highest ever debut for a new rock band, selling over 188,000 copies in its first week, and appearing at number four on the Billboard 200. Van Leeuwen toured extensively with the band, initially as the opening act for Nine Inch Nails, followed a number of headlining tours around the world. Van Leeuwen recorded guitar parts on only three tracks of A Perfect Circle's second album, Thirteenth Step, before successfully auditioning for a spot in Josh Homme's Queens of the Stone Age.

Queens of the Stone Age
After outperforming Jeordie White and others in the audition, Van Leeuwen was welcomed as the band's second guitarist for their Songs for the Deaf tour. Besides playing guitar, Van Leeuwen also performed on lap steel guitar, keyboards, backing vocals and occasionally bass guitar. Due to the band's schedule, Van Leeuwen had only one week to learn 30 songs before the tour began. For the European leg of the album's supporting tour, Dave Grohl left to return to his main band Foo Fighters. He was replaced with former Danzig drummer Joey Castillo. Songs for the Deaf was a critical and commercial success, and the singles "No One Knows" and "Go with the Flow" became hits on both radio and MTV. The tour culminated in a number of headline dates in Australia in January 2004.

Van Leeuwen's first recording with QOTSA was Lullabies to Paralyze. The band entered the studio with long-time collaborator and multi-instrumentalist Alain Johannes, who replaced Nick Oliveri on the album. Van Leeuwen aimed to fill in some of the gaps in the music where he felt the sound could be expanded through atmospheric and ambient textures made by guitar, lap steel and piano. The album (the title of which is taken from a lyric in Mosquito Song from Songs for the Deaf) featured several guest appearances, most notably ZZ Top's Billy Gibbons, who performed backing vocals and lead guitar on "Burn the Witch" and the ZZ Top cover, "Precious and Grace". Despite reportedly turning down an invitation to remain with the band, Mark Lanegan recorded vocals on new tracks, and appeared with the band on the supporting tour when scheduling and his health permitted. The album was leaked onto the internet in February 2005, and was aired by Australian radio on March 3, 2005, as an unsubstantiated 'World Premiere'. The album was then officially released on March 22, 2005, in the US, and debuted as number 5 on the Billboard Music Chart: the greatest initial success of any QOTSA record to date. On November 22, 2005, the band released a live album/DVD set called Over the Years and Through the Woods, which featured a live concert filmed in London, and bonus features (including rare videos dating from 1998 to 2005).

After touring to support the album, the band headed back into the studio in July 2006. A year later, Van Leeuwen reported that the band had written new material that was "still in its infancy", which Homme later suggested might be released as an EP. This matured into their 2007 release Era Vulgaris, to which Van Leeuwen contributed a significant amount of material.

Several sites reported that the album would include many guest vocalists, including Trent Reznor from Nine Inch Nails, Julian Casablancas from The Strokes, Mark Lanegan, Billy Gibbons of ZZ Top, and wittingly, deceased humorist Erma Bombeck. Josh Homme described the record as "dark, hard, and electrical, sort of like a construction worker". Era Vulgaris was completed in early April 2007 and released in June 2007 in the US The tracks "Sick, Sick, Sick" and "3's & 7's" were released as singles in early June. Bassist Michael Shuman (Wires on Fire, Jubilee) and keyboardist Dean Fertita (The Waxwings, The Raconteurs) took over touring duties from Alain Johannes and Natasha Shneider respectively.

Following a subsequent interview with Homme, The Globe and Mail reported that the EP "could contain as many as 10 B-sides recorded during the Era Vulgaris sessions." It was since reported however that the EP would not be released due to the record label's unwillingness to put out another QOTSA release at this time. In a September issue of NME Magazine, Homme stated that he was going back to make the new QOTSA and Desert Sessions records, along with remastering the 1998 (QOTSA) self-titled album for an early 2009 release. Homme also stated Queens' new album is going to be a "desert orgy in the dark".

In 2013, QOTSA released ...Like Clockwork, Van Leeuwen's third full album with the band. On the album, Van Leeuwen plays guitar, percussion, twelve-string guitar, twelve-string slide guitar, lap steel, synthesizers, acoustic guitar and provides vocals. The album was the first QOTSA album to reach number one on the Billboard 200. It also reached number two on the UK Albums Chart and was nominated for three Grammy Awards, including Best Rock Album.

Other musical work
In 2001, Van Leeuwen joined the supergroup Revenge of the Triads with Nine Inch Nails keyboardist Charlie Clouser and Snake River Conspiracy bassist/producer Jason Slater. Van Leeuwen, who acted the band's main vocalist, described the band as a mixture of all three of the members influences, and stated that the band did not fit in any specific genre. The band was signed to LMC Records, an independent label distributed by MCA Records, and worked on a debut album before breaking up almost exactly a year later due to problems with LMC not paying the band and the members' losing interest in the project. The album remains unfinished and unreleased.

In 2005, Van Leeuwen released Hooray For Dark Matter with his side project Enemy. The album features bassist Eddie Nappi from the Mark Lanegan Band, and his former bandmate from Failure Kelli Scott on drums (who had replaced Quicksand's Alan Cage). Van Leeuwen describes Enemy as his "big, dumb rock trio", and "a vehicle driven by pure and utter disgust of mediocrity and general frustration with the human condition". During Van Leeuwen's time with A Perfect Circle, Enemy recorded a five track demo in what he called "Guerilla-style recording" at various studios. The band (unusually) offered to be signed by a record label by advertising for the princely sum of $250,000 on eBay. Enemy was ultimately signed by Control Group/TCG, who released their debut album. After joining the Queens of the Stone Age, Van Leeuwen has also contributed music to band members' various side projects: such as The Desert Sessions, Mondo Generator, Eagles of Death Metal, The Gutter Twins and Mark Lanegan's solo album Bubblegum. After the Era Vulgaris tour's end, Van Leeuwen began touring with his current side project, Sweethead.

In 2016, Van Leeuwen toured with Iggy Pop, Josh Homme, Matt Helders and Matt Sweeney in support of their album Post Pop Depression. He also formed Gone Is Gone, a supergroup also consisting of Troy Sanders, the singer and bass player from Mastodon, Tony Hajjar, the drummer for At the Drive-In, and Mike Zarin, a multi-instrumentalist who appeared with Van Leeuwen on Sweethead's Descent To The Surface. An EP will be released in the summer of 2016, and the band is developing a studio album for release later in the year. In 2017, he contributed guitar parts to Chelsea Wolfe's fifth studio album, Hiss Spun.

In 2022, Van Leeuwen took on touring guitarist duties for The Damned on the US dates of their tour, temporarily replacing Captain Sensible. Later in 2022 he replaced Dave Navarro as touring guitarist for Jane's Addiction.

Musical equipment
According to Van Leeuwen, Queens of the Stone Age (and Homme in particular) have a "veil of secrecy" regarding their exact setup, in order to maintain a unique guitar sound. However, over time Van Leeuwen eventually disclosed some information regarding his gear. When he first joined the band in 2002 for the Songs for the Deaf promotional tour, he leaned toward duplicating Josh Homme's setup, favoring Ampeg guitar combos and specific pedals. All of his guitars were fitted with a variety of Seymour Duncan pickups, most often Customs or JB. During the Lullabies to Paralyze period, both Homme and Van Leeuwen favored semi-hollow guitars with P-90 pickups due to their natural resonance. To prohibit "bad feedback", he stuffed pieces of foam into the F-holes of some. On Era Vulgaris he switched to Fender Telecasters and Jaguars, recorded through small, cheap amps. His guitars are tuned in standard 440, mostly E, and C, though one-off tunings have appeared on a few songs.
He is a steady user of Mastery Bridges, utilizing their Offset and Tele models in addition to the Offset Vibrato. Troy has also said that his live rig is considerably different than what he uses during recording, due to the fact that he considers most of his vintage equipment too unreliable for touring. He uses custom gauge Dunlop 11's for standard tuning and 12's for lower tunings. Van Leeuwen uses Silver Hercos .75mm picks, the same picks Jimmy Page uses, and got a signature version of them in early 2017.

Other instruments

In addition to guitar and lap steel, Troy has also played a Clavia Nord Electro keyboard and later a Moog Little Phattie synthesizer during live performances and recordings. After Nick Oliveri's departure from the band, Troy also played an Epiphone Rivoli bass or a Custom Yamaha SA-bass during several Queens of the Stone Age recordings and the tour following Lullabies to Paralyze, sharing bass playing duties with Alain Johannes, as well as using a blue 1967 Mosrite Ventures bass in the "Little Sister" video. Following Era Vulgaris in which bassist Michael Shuman and keyboardist/guitarist Dean Fertita were hired, Troy went back to being primarily the lead guitarist live—although he also occasionally contributes with synths, lap steel, and back up vocals.

Selected discography

Van Leeuwen has appeared on a wide range of albums from various bands and performers from many genres.

References

External links

 
 Mister Enemy – Troy Van Leeuwen fansite
 Official Queens of the Stone Age Website
 Official Enemy MySpace

Living people
American rock singers
American multi-instrumentalists
American rock guitarists
American male guitarists
Slide guitarists
American rock bass guitarists
American male bass guitarists
American rock keyboardists
American percussionists
American people of Dutch descent
American alternative rock musicians
American rock musicians
Queens of the Stone Age members
A Perfect Circle members
1970 births
21st-century American singers
21st-century American bass guitarists
Failure (band) members